The secretary of state of Oregon, an elected constitutional officer within the executive branch of the government of the U.S. state of Oregon, is first in the line of succession to the governor. The duties of the office are auditor of public accounts, chief elections officer, and administrator of public records. Additionally, the secretary of state serves on the Oregon State Land Board and chairs the Oregon Sustainability Board. Following every United States Census, if the Oregon Legislative Assembly cannot come to an agreement over changes to legislative redistricting, the duty falls to the secretary of state.

The current secretary of state is Democrat Shemia Fagan, who was sworn in on January 4, 2021, in her 4th grade classroom in Dufur, Oregon.

Divisions
 Archives Division maintains the official records of the Oregon government, provides public access to them, and publishes the Oregon Blue Book and the Oregon Administrative Rules. Established in 1947, the division is located in the Cecil L. Edwards Archives Building in downtown Salem on the capitol mall.
 Audits Division provides oversight of public spending. The department began in 1929 and oversees state agency compliance with accounting rules, reports on the performance of state departments, and oversees the standards for audits of local governments within Oregon, among other tasks.
 Corporation Division handles filings relating to company law, including the formation of corporations and other businesses and organizations, and other matters related to the Uniform Commercial Code. They are also in charge of operating the notaries public system.
 Elections Division performs administrative and oversight duties concerning elections in concert with the County governments, maintains a central voter registry, and publishes the Voters' Pamphlet. These duties include working with the referendum, initiative, and recall process and accepting the registration of candidates for elective office.
 Executive Division oversees the other four divisions of the office. The Secretary of State's office is located in Oregon State Capitol|Salem]].

List of Oregon secretaries of state

Provisional government (1841–1849)

Five individuals served as clerk and recorder, the predecessor office to the secretary of state:
George W. LeBreton, February 18, 1841 – March 4, 1844
Overton Johnson, March 4, 1844 – May 25, 1844
John E. Long, May 25, 1844 – June 21, 1846
Frederick Prigg, June 26, 1846 – September 16, 1848
Samuel M. Holderness, September 19, 1848 – March 10, 1849

Territorial government (1849–1859)
Oregon's first territorial secretary was elected by the legislature, to serve until President Lisbet Falero could appoint his successors.

State government (1859–present)

References

External links
 

1859 establishments in Oregon